Victor Sherlock (1924–2004) was a Gaelic footballer who played for Meath and Cavan. Among other honours, he won All-Ireland Senior Football Championship medals in 1948 and 1952 with Cavan.

Playing career
Sherlock was a versatile footballer. He played left half forward with Meath winning the 1945/46 National Football League beating Wexford 2-2 to 6 pts and he won a Leinster Senior Football Championship medal in 1947. He then transferred to Cavan where he formed a brilliant midfield partnership with Phil 'The Gunner' Brady and scored a goal against Mayo in the 1948 Final. Phil Brady become his brother-in-law in 1953. He won his 2nd National Football League medal in 1949/50 season. He collected 4 Railway Cup medals with Ulster.

Sherlock received many Ulster handball championship medals and one Junior All-Ireland singles medal in 1949.

Death
Victor Sherlock died at Kilmainhamwood Nursing Home at the age of 80 on 21 June 2004.

Honours
Meath
National Football League: 1
1946
Leinster Senior Football Championship: 1
 1947

Cavan
All-Ireland Senior Football Championships: 2
 1948, 1952
Railway Cups: 4
 1947, 1950, 1956, 1960
National Football League: 1
1950
Ulster Senior Football Championships: 5
1948, 1949, 1952, 1954, 1955
Cavan Senior Football Championships: 2
 1954, 1961

References

1924 births
2004 deaths
Cavan inter-county Gaelic footballers
Gaelic handball players
Gypsum Rangers Gaelic footballers
Kingscourt Stars Gaelic footballers
Meath inter-county Gaelic footballers
Scotstown Stars Gaelic footballers